Malacothrix floccifera is a species of flowering plant in the family Asteraceae known by the common name woolly desertdandelion. It is native to many of the northern and central mountain ranges of California, including the Sierra Nevada, where its distribution extends into Nevada. Its habitat includes forest, woodland, and chaparral. It is an annual herb producing a hairless flowering stem up to about 42 centimeters in maximum height. The fleshy oblong leaves are cut into teeth or lobes and have cottony patches of woolly fibers. The inflorescence is an array of flower heads lined with hairless phyllaries. The ray florets are up to 1.5 centimeters long and are often white, but sometimes yellow.

External links
Jepson Manual Treatment
USDA Plants Profile
Flora of North America
Photo gallery

floccifera
Flora of California
Flora of Nevada
Flora without expected TNC conservation status